Washington University in St. Louis has a broad array of centers for particular studies and research institutes.  The following summary of many of these is organized by general field of inquiry.

Biological sciences
Various ecological systems and habitats help provide valuable outdoor education and teaching opportunities for classes and research projects at the University.
The Genome Technology Access Center (GTAC) - The GTAC was created to establish DNA/RNA analysis resources for researchers at Washington University and beyond.  It offers NextGen sequencing, microarray, qPCR and other medium to high throughput detection technologies on a fee-for-service basis.
The McDonnell Genome Institute - an organization focusing on genomics research. The Institute played a major role in the Human Genome Project, to which it contributed 25% of the finished sequence, and is currently a major participant in both The Cancer Genome Atlas and the 1000 Genomes Project.

Business
 Boeing Center for Technology and Information Management - Focused collaboration between business and academe. Businesses provide professors and students with access to in-house real-world technology, and these researchers use these data and machines to formulate theories on operations and supply chain management to better improve logistics and processes.
 Center for Research in Economics and Strategy - supports empirical and scientific research to aid in the understanding of how markets behave, how firms strategize, and how industries evolve.
Reuben C. Taylor Experimental Laboratory - a high-technology facility for conducting experimental research to analyze negotiation, market behavior, and decision making. Included in the laboratory is a computer network that allows participants to make decisions and communicate with others in real-time.
 Skandalaris Center for Entrepreneurial Studies - established in 2004 with a grant from the Kauffman Foundation. The Center's initiatives focus on corporate innovation, application and commercialization for early-stage science, student-initiated ventures (such as the Hatchery course and the Olin Cup competition), social entrepreneurship, and connecting the University with the St. Louis start-up community.

Engineering
 Cardiac Bioelectricity and Arrhythmia Center - an interdisciplinary center whose goals are to study the mechanisms of rhythm disorders of the heart, and to develop new tools for their diagnosis and treatment. 
 Center for Air Pollution Impact and Trend Analysis - performs air quality research and data dissemination, maintains a literature and data library, and publishes reports and journals. CAPITA specializes in the effects of aerosol research and the impact of air pollution on the atmosphere.
 Center for Application of Information Technologies (CAIT) - provides resources, classes, training, and professional development opportunities for Information Technology leaders at Washington University and throughout the St. Louis region, in order to make the region more competitive as an IT hub. 
 Institute of Materials Science - a collaboration that aims to bring together researchers in engineering, physics, chemistry, and earth and planetary sciences to "foster a culture of interdisciplinary materials science research and education at the university."
 Center for Optimization & Semantic Control - an effort between various academic divisions at Washington University, and leaders in the US Air Force and Aerospace and Air Transportation industries. The COSC works to use mathematical models and optimization problems to solve complex issues in aerospace and transportation systems.
 International Center for Advanced Renewable Energy and Sustainability - I-CARES is a $55 million effort to explore alternative solutions for fuel, by researching biofuels from plant and microbial systems to forward sustainable alternative environmental practices.
 McDonnell Center for the Space Sciences - A coordinated effort between the School of Engineering, and the departments of Earth and Planetary Sciences, Physics, and Chemistry in the College of Arts and Sciences. Groups work to research broad questions in the space sciences, such as the formation of planets, the beginning of the Universe, and geologic activity on Earth. A unique, state-of-the-art microprobe known as Cameca NanoSIMS analyzes cosmic dust, and recently separated and identified individual presolar dust grains that forms around new stars.
 National Science Foundation Science and Technology Center for Engineering MechanoBiology - CEMB is a $24 million effort, conducted jointly between Washington University in St. Louis and the University of Pennsylvania, to "how single cells function in hopes to use the research to prevent disease and promote more efficient crop practices."
 Photosynthetic Antenna Research Center - aspires to maximize photosynthetic antenna efficiency in living organisms and to fabricate robust micron-scale biohybrid light-harvesting systems to drive chemical processes or generate photocurrent.

Humanities and Social Sciences
 Center for the Humanities - formerly the International Writers Center, has expanded its focus and purpose; is "dedicated to letters and humanistic research and their presence in public life."
 Center for New Institutional Social Sciences - founded in 1999 by Nobel Laureate Douglass C. North, Ph.D, the Center works to apply economics more effectively in enhancing the growth of  developing nations.
 Center on Urban Research & Public Policy - studies the urban environment in America, its successes and failures, and advances discussion on urban issues by research, teaching, promoting involvement of residents in building their community infrastructure to enhance the urban fabric of their city.
 International Society for New Institutional Economics (ISNIE) - an interdisciplinary enterprise combining economics, law, organization theory, political science, sociology and anthropology to understand the institutions of social, political and commercial life, using economics as a common language.

Interdisciplinary
 The Lifelong Learning Institute (LLI) -  affiliate of the Elderhostel Institute Network. Courses are not-for-credit peer-learning groups. Participants must be members and age 55 or older.
 Institute for School Partnerships - connects local K-12 education with Washington University scholarship.

Language and literature
Max Kade Center for Contemporary German Literature - promotes teaching and research of modern German literature and supports collaboration among students/scholars in the field as the only center of its kind in the United States. Part of the Department of Germanic Languages and Literatures.

Law
The Washington University School of Law has five Centers and Institutes, which are mostly housed at the Anheuser-Busch and Seigle Hall buildings:
 Center for Empirical Research in the Law - focuses on applying sophisticated empirical methodology to legal studies research.
 Center for Interdisciplinary Studies - supports interdisciplinary legal research and scholarship.
 Center for Research on Innovation and Entrepreneurship -  provides law students with the ability to work with intellectual property counsel and provide legal advice to both the University and the wider community.  Law students collaborate with students from the School of Medicine, Olin School of Business, the Department of Biomedical Engineering, the George Warren Brown School of Social Work, and Arts & Sciences.
 Whitney R. Harris World Law Institute - focuses as a center for instruction and research in international and comparative law to prepare students for a global society.

Medicine
 Alzheimer's Disease Research Center (ADRC) - founded in 1985, the mission of the ADRC at Washington University School of Medicine is to promote collaborative research in the treatment and assessment of Alzheimer's disease.  The center also provides a training environment for postdoctoral fellows, students in nursing, social work and medicine, along with residents in geriatrics, psychiatry and neurology.
 BioMed 21 - started in 2003, BioMed 21 is an interdisciplinary research center linking life sciences and medical education throughout Washington University. To be housed in a  facility in the Medical Complex to be named the BJC Institute of Health at Washington University, BioMed 21 includes five Interdisciplinary Research Centers:
 Center for Cancer Genomics
 Center for the Investigation of Membrane Excitability Disorders  
 Center for Women's Infectious Disease Research
 Hope Center Program on Protein Folding and Neurodegeneration
 Center for Interdisciplinary Studies of Diabetic Cardiovascular Disease
 Central Institute for the Deaf (CID) - combines education, research and clinical and community service to benefit individuals who are deaf and hearing-impaired.  Audiologists, teachers and scientists serve as graduate program faculty and Washington University graduate students gain experience in real-world situations.
 Hope Center for Neurological Disorders - formed by a collaborative alliance between Washington University School of Medicine and Hope Happens, a St. Louis-based non-profit formerly known as ALS Hope, its mission is to improve the lives of people with neurological disorders (particularly ALS, Alzheimer's Disease, brain and spinal cord injury, cerebral palsy, epilepsy, multiple sclerosis, Parkinson's, and stroke) by discovering the fundamental mechanisms of neurodegeneration and translating this knowledge into new methods for diagnosis, treatment, and prevention.
 Mallinckrodt Institute of Radiology - serves as the Department of Radiology for the Washington University School of Medicine. Institute physicians and scientists are faculty members of the School of Medicine, and physicians are on the medical staff of Barnes-Jewish Hospital and St. Louis Children's Hospital. Multidisciplinary research training programs combine both clinical and basic research.

Political science
 John C. Danforth Center on Religion & Politics - seeks to examine the role of religion and politics in the United States. The Center's mission is the serve as an ideologically neutral place that fosters rigorous scholarship and civil public discourse around the areas of American religion and politics. The Center was founded in 2010 by an endowment gift from the Danforth Foundation.
 Gephardt Institute for Civic and Community Engagement - founded with a major gift from former U.S. Congressman Richard Gephardt.  Focuses on the value, interest and importance of public service and civic engagement. Major activities of the Gephardt Institute include the hosting of speakers series, internship and career placement services, granting of money to faculty and students for community-based teaching and learning, supporting co-curricular activities with the community service office, and a summer stipend program, where the University financially supports students who take uncompensated internships in the field of public service.
 Weidenbaum Center - combines academic research with policy analysis centering on economy, business, government, and public policy. The Weidenbaum Center is non-profit and non-partisan, and programs events, hosts speakers and lecturers, holds retreats, and publishes journals to further its mission.

Social work
 Kathryn M. Buder Center for American Indian Studies - founded to provide scholarships for Native American students, the Center for American Indian Studies is now located within the School of Social work and is geared toward the "academic advancement and study of American Indian issues related to social work."  The center still continues to offer scholarships.
 Center for Latino Family Research - is the only center in a U.S. school of social work that conducts research on Latino social, health, mental health, and family and community development in the U.S. and Latin America. The Center's ultimate goal is to help improve the lives of Latino families in all of the Americas.
 Center for Mental Health Services Research - through its national network of collaborative research partners, works with public social service agencies to build a base of evidence designed to address the challenges of delivering mental health services to vulnerable populations. The center is one of only 11 centers of its kind in the country and the only one part of a social work school. 
 Center for Social Development - the center's domestic and international research focuses on building assets of individuals and families so they can invest in life goals such as homes, education, and enterprise development and thus break the cycle of poverty. The Center's work also explores issues of civic engagement to ensure the people of all ages and economic levels actively participate in our society.

References

External links

Washington University in St. Louis